Halgerda malesso is a species of sea slug, a dorid nudibranch, shell-less marine gastropod mollusks in the family Discodorididae.

Distribution
This species was described from Guam, Mariana Islands. It has also been reported from the Marshall Islands.

References

Discodorididae
Gastropods described in 1993